Miltodes is a genus of beetles in the family Carabidae, containing the following species:

 Miltodes ellipticus Andrewes, 1937
 Miltodes granum Andrewes, 1922

References

Licininae